Alessandro Iacobucci (born 3 June 1991) is an Italian footballer who plays as a goalkeeper for  club Vicenza.

Biography

Youth career
Born in Pescara, Abruzzo, Iacobucci started his career at home province club Renato Curi Angolana (located at Città Sant'Angelo, the Province of Pescara). He joined Serie B club Mantova in 2007 in temporary deal, rejoining former Curi Angolana team-mate Alberto Creati.

Siena
After the bankrupt of Mantova, he was automatically released. In July 2010 he was signed by Serie B club Siena. He was one of the backup of Ferdinando Coppola in the first team and as the first choice in the "spring" under-20 team, ahead Richard Gabriel Marcone. Iacobucci made his debut in round 42 (last round), after the team certainly promoted back to Serie A. He replaced Simone Farelli in the second half.

In July 2011 he left for Italian third division club Südtirol, ahead Michał Miśkiewicz as first choice. With the arrival of Iacobucci, South Tyrol also sold its first choice of 2010–11 season, Davide Zomer to Lega Pro Seconda Divisione.

Parma
In June 2012 Parma signed Andrea Rossi (€1.8M), Iacobucci (€1.7M) and Giuseppe Pacini (€0.5M) from Siena and sold Manuel Coppola (€1.6M), Alberto Galuppo (€1.7M) and Abdou Doumbia (€0.5M) to Siena, in July Siena also signed Paolo Hernán Dellafiore (€1.8M) and sold Gonçalo Brandão  (€1.6M) to Parma, made the 8-men swap deal a pure swap without involvement of cash.

On 28 June 2012 Iacobucci was signed by Spezia Calcio in temporary deal. That season Spezia had also signed Stefano Okaka, Raffaele Schiavi, Mário Rui from Parma, Parma half-owned players Lorenzo Crisetig (also from Inter), Matteo Mandorlini (also from Brescia) and Siena player Agostino Garofalo. On 31 January 2013, a pre-set price was insert into the temporary contract of Iacobucci. The co-ownership was also terminated ca. January 2013 for a peppercorn fee of €500. The loan of Iacobucci (€100,000) and Gianluca Musacci  (€400,000) had cost Spezia €500,000 but Parma also gave performance subsidy of €200,000 to Spezia for Musacci.

On 10 July 2013 Iacobucci was signed by Latina.

On 7 August 2018, Iacobucci signed with Frosinone.

On 6 November 2021, he joined his hometown club Pescara in Serie C.

On 28 June 2022, Iacobucci returned to Südtirol on a one-year deal. On 13 January 2023, he moved to Vicenza.

International career
Iacobucci received his first U-19 call-up in August 2009, from Massimo Piscedda. However, he did not enter the squad to the friendly match in September. In November, he received a call-up to a goalkeeper training camp from Antonio Rocca. In December, he returned to U19 team for a training camp. He was the backup of Simone Colombi in March 2010 against Germany.

In 2010–11 he was selected to the feeder team of U-21, the Italy under-21 Serie B representative team. He played once, against Serbian First League Selection.

In 2011–12 season he was the regular member of Italy U20 team at 2011–12 Four Nations Tournament. He only missed the last round which played by Mattia Perin. He also played against Ghana, an unofficial match against Italy U-21 Serie B for charity, against Macedonia and Denmark.

In 2012–13 season he played twice for U21 "B", won Malta U21 5–0 and a goalless draw with Russian First League Selection. In both matches Iacobucci was the first choice in the first half; he was replaced by Alessandro Berardi at half-time and Elia Bastianoni in the 81st minute respectively.

References

External links
 FC South Tyrol Profile 
 Football.it Profile 

1991 births
Sportspeople from Pescara
Footballers from Abruzzo
Living people
Italian footballers
Mantova 1911 players
A.C.N. Siena 1904 players
F.C. Südtirol players
Parma Calcio 1913 players
Spezia Calcio players
Latina Calcio 1932 players
Virtus Entella players
Frosinone Calcio players
Delfino Pescara 1936 players
L.R. Vicenza players
Serie A players
Serie B players
Serie C players
Italy youth international footballers
Association football goalkeepers